Gloria Williams (August 1, 1942 - July 5, 2000) was an American singer notable for being the original lead singer of an early incarnation of Martha and the Vandellas under the name, The Del-Phis.

Born Gloria Jean Williamson in Detroit, Michigan in 1942, Williams auditioned for a spot in a girl group in 1957, and found herself accompanying Annette Beard, Rosalind Ashford and Martha Reeves in the christened Del-Phis.

The group performed in benefits and high school parties before being signed to the Chess Records subsidiary Checkmate (later bought by Motown Records), where the group recorded a single, "I'll Let You Know", with Williams on lead. Once at Motown, the group sang backing vocals for other acts/artists on studio recordings, such as Marvin Gaye during this period. Williams sang lead on an early single, "There He Is (At My Door)", on the Mel-O-Dy subsidiary of Motown after the group changed their name to The Vels. On the single's flip side, "You'll Never Cherish A Love So True", she shares the lead with Rosalind Ashford, who recorded a spoken part.

However, when the single flopped, a frustrated Williams left the group leaving the band as a trio. The group went on to international fame with Reeves as lead singer under the name of Martha and the Vandellas.

Williams died of diabetes complications in Detroit on July 5, 2000.  She was 57 years old.

References

External links 
 The Original Vandellas
 'Martha and the Vandellas' Vocal Group Hall of Fame Page 
 The Vells a.k.a. The Del-Phis & The Vandellas

Martha and the Vandellas members
American contraltos
1942 births
2000 deaths
Singers from Detroit
20th-century American singers
Deaths from diabetes
20th-century American women singers